Yiyang railway station is a railway station located in Heshan District, Yiyang, Hunan, China, on the Shimen–Changsha railway and Luoyang–Zhanjiang railway lines, which are operated by China Railway Guangzhou Group.

See also 

 Yiyang South railway station

References

Buildings and structures in Yiyang
Railway stations in Hunan
Stations on the Luoyang–Zhanjiang railway
Stations on the Shimen–Changsha railway
Railway stations in China opened in 1997